Dubuque Bank and Trust Company is a bank headquartered in Dubuque, Iowa. It is a subsidiary of Heartland Financial USA, Inc., a bank holding company. The bank has 8 branches, all of which are in Iowa. It is the 7th largest bank headquartered in Iowa.

History
The bank was established on July 3, 1935.

In 1988, the bank acquired Fireside Credit after it filed for bankruptcy protection.

In 1989, the bank acquired Key City Bank.

In 1991, the bank acquired Farley State Bank.

In 2004, Douglas J. Horstmann was named president and chief executive officer of the bank. Horstmann retired in 2017.

In 2012, the bank acquired 3 branches from Liberty Bank, FSB.

References

Banks based in Iowa
Economy of Dubuque, Iowa
Banks established in 1935
1935 establishments in Iowa